The 1955 season was the Chicago Bears' 36th in the National Football League.  The team matched on their 8–4 record from 1954 under head coach George Halas, repeating as the runner-up in the NFL's Western Conference.  Chicago opened the season with three losses, then won eight of nine.

During the season, owner Halas announced that he was stepping down as head coach, ending his third ten-year tenure as coach. Longtime assistant Paddy Driscoll, age 61, was promoted in early February, led the team for two seasons, then was reassigned when Halas returned as head coach in 1958.

Regular season

Schedule

Note: Intra-conference opponents are in bold text.

Standings

Roster

References

Chicago Bears
Chicago Bears seasons
Chicago Bears